S. Charles Lee (September 5, 1899 - January 27, 1990) was an American architect recognized as one of the most prolific and distinguished motion picture theater designers on the West Coast.

Life

Early life 
Simeon Charles Levi was born in Chicago in 1899 to American-born parents of German-Jewish ancestry, Julius and Hattie (Stiller) Levi. He grew up going to vaudeville theatres, nickelodeons, and early movie houses. A tinkerer interested in mechanical things, Lee built three motorcars as a teenager. His interest in mechanics led him to Lake Technical High School in Chicago, where he graduated in 1916.

Education
While in high school in 1915, he worked after school in the office of Chicago architect Henry Newhouse, a family friend who specialized in theater design: small motion picture houses, nickelodeons and remodeling storefronts into theaters. Lee attended Chicago Technical College, graduating with honors in 1918. His first job was as architect for the South Park Board of the City of Chicago. During World War I he enlisted in the Navy. After his discharge in 1920, he entered the Armour Institute of Technology to study architecture, where he was exposed to the principles of the École des Beaux-Arts which are reflected in his later work.

While in Chicago, Lee worked for Rapp & Rapp, a highly regarded Chicago architectural firm well known for movie theater design. Lee was also influenced by Louis Sullivan's lectures in his architecture classes and Frank Lloyd Wright's work, particularly Midway Gardens and Wright's Oak Park studio. Lee was also impressed by the 1922 Chicago Tribune Tower competition, which juxtaposed historicism with modernism. Lee considered himself a modernist, and his career revealed "both the Beaux Arts discipline and emphasis on planning and the modernist functionalism and freedom of form."

Career
In 1922, Lee moved to Los Angeles. His first major movie palace was the Tower Theatre, a Spanish-Romanesque-Moorish design that launched a career that would make Lee the principal designer of motion picture theaters in Los Angeles during the 1930s and 1940s. He is credited with designing over 400 theaters throughout California and Mexico. His palatial and Baroque Los Angeles Theatre (1931) is regarded by many architectural historians as the finest theater building in Los Angeles.

Lee was an early proponent of Art Deco and Moderne style theaters, including Fresno's Tower Theatre. The Bruin Theater (1937) and Academy Theatre (1939) are among his most characteristic. The latter, located in Inglewood, California, is a prime example of Lee's successful response to the automobile. After World War II, Lee recognized that the grand theater building had become a thing of the past, and began to focus on new technologies in industrial architecture. His work in the field of tilt-up building systems was published in Architectural Record in 1952.

Buildings
 La Puente Valley Woman's Club, La Puente, CA (1923)
 Hollywood Melrose Hotel (1927)
 Tower Theatre (Los Angeles) (1927)
 El Mirador Apartment Building (West Hollywood) (1929)
 Fox Wilshire Theatre, Beverly Hills, California (1930)
 Fox Theater (Bakersfield, California) (1930)
 Fox Phoenix Theatre (1931)
 Los Angeles Theatre, Los Angeles (1931)
 Hollywood & Western Building, Hollywood (1931)
 Max Factor Building, Hollywood (1935) – currently Hollywood Museum
 Bruin Theater, Westwood, Los Angeles (1937)
 Fox (Alpha) Theater, Bell, California (1938)
 Tower Theatre (Fresno, California) (1939)
Academy Theatre, Inglewood, California (1939)
De Anza Theatre, Riverside, California (1939)
 Fremont Theater, San Luis Obispo, California (1942)
 Huntridge Theater, Las Vegas, Nevada (1944)
 Star Theater, La Puente, California (1947)
 Temple Israel of Hollywood (1948)
Fox Theatre, Inglewood, California (1949)

Awards
Lee's work on the Los Angeles Tower Theatre was featured in the regional architectural journal Architect & Engineer in 1928.
In 1934, Lee was honored for architectural excellence by the Royal Institute of British Architects at the International Exhibition of Contemporary Architecture in London, for his 1931 "Spanish American Mission style" design for the Fox Florence Theatre in Los Angeles.
One of Lee's non-theater projects, Temple Israel of Hollywood, a Jewish synagogue designed in the California Mission tradition, was featured in Architectural Record in 1946.
Lee received the highest recognition of the Society of Registered Architects, the "Synergy Award," in 1975.
The UCLA Graduate School of Architecture and Urban Planning established an endowed chair honoring Lee in 1986.

References

External links

 List of theatres by S. Charles Lee
 S. Charles Lee Collection at UCLA
 

1899 births
1990 deaths
Architects from Chicago
American theatre architects
Modernist architects from the United States
American people of German-Jewish descent